The Emu Bay Railway 10 class were a class of diesel-hydraulic locomotives built by Walkers Limited, Maryborough for the Emu Bay Railway between 1963 and 1966.

History
On 17 August 1963, the Emu Bay Railway took delivery of three diesel-hydraulic locomotives from Walkers Limited. A fourth was assembled at the Tasmanian Government Railways’ Launceston workshops in April 1966. In 1969/70, the pneumatic control gear was replaced with electro-pneumatic equipment to allow the class to operate in multiple with the 11 class. Between 1980 and 1992 all were repowered with the Caterpillar D398B as fitted to the 11 class.

All were included in the April 1998 sale of the Emu Bay Railway to the Australian Transport Network. Following the June 2000 closure of the Hellyer Mine all were stored and disposed of in 2001 to preservation organisations.

Status table

References

B-B locomotives
Diesel-hydraulic locomotives of Australia
Diesel locomotives of Tasmania
Railway locomotives introduced in 1963
Walkers Limited locomotives
3 ft 6 in gauge locomotives of Australia